Rabbittown or Rabbit Town may refer to:
Rabbittown, St. John's
Rabbit Town, Kentucky
Rabbittown, a Canadian television comedy special which aired in 2006